Cabela's Dangerous Hunts is a 2003 video game published by Activision in conjunction with Cabela's for PlayStation 2, Xbox and Microsoft Windows.

Gameplay 
Cabela's Dangerous Hunts is a first-person shooter where the player goes on hunting trips. The game features several game modes, such as Career Mode, which allows the player to create a profile and customize their stats, age, and appearance. There are many events which may result in a failed hunt: penalties for killing non-game animals, including a failure if three are killed; falling into deep streams can result in drowning; falling off high ledges can result in injury or death; and certain animals, such as bears, cape buffalos, wolves, coyotes, hyenas, mountain lions, and leopards, can attack and kill the player. The player also has an energy limit, eventually, causing tiredness and the need to slow down. This effect can be reduced by carrying lighter equipment and conserving energy.

There are twelve exotic locations which feature twenty-six animals. There are a variety of game, with white rhinoceros, zebras, and hyenas being more challenging than deer, elk, and wolves, and of weaponry: eleven types of rifles, three types of handguns, two types of bows, one type of crossbow, and three hunting knives. Items like scent removers and different animal calls can be used to attract the animals, while ground blinds and tree stands can camouflage the player.

The game also features the game-mode Action Zone, containing different stages for hunting. Once in these zones, the player's aim is to kill several animals, thereby passing the level. Once all the predators are taken down, a portal will appear to take the player to the next location.

Locations in the game include Wisconsin, Alaska, Quebec, California, Idaho, New Mexico, Alberta, and Tanzania. Each location houses different animals that the player can hunt. The player has the ability to change the season and are of the hunt, and, in Career Hunt Mode, they can choose between different, uniquely-perked characters.

Reception 

The PC and PlayStation 2 versions received "mixed or average reviews", while the Xbox version received "generally unfavorable reviews", according to video game review aggregator Metacritic. The game was said to have "passable" gameplay and a very neat feel to it. It is featured in the PlayStation 2's Greatest Hits series.

References

External links 
  Official website
 

2003 video games
Cabela's video games
PlayStation 2 games
Xbox games
Windows games
Activision games
Hunting video games
Simulation video games
Action video games
First-person shooters
Video games set in Canada
Video games set in Tanzania
Video games set in Zimbabwe
Video games set in the United States
Video games developed in Romania
Fun Labs games
Sand Grain Studios games